Hammer of the Witches is the eleventh studio album by English extreme metal band Cradle of Filth. It was released on 10 July 2015 and is their first release under record label Nuclear Blast. Hammer of the Witches features the band's new line-up following the departure of Paul Allender and James McIlroy, which includes new guitarists Marek 'Ashok' Šmerda and Richard Shaw and new keyboardist and female vocalist Lindsay Schoolcraft.

Background
Hammer of the Witches is the first Cradle of Filth album since 1998's Cruelty and the Beast to not feature work from longtime guitarist Paul Allender. Work on the album began in early 2014, with frontman Dani emphasizing that the band planned on taking their time with it. In an interview in 2016, Lindsay Schoolcraft stated that she was pleased with the fan-response and that the band had actually finished work on the album quicker than they had expected to.

Cover art
Vocalist Dani Filth stated: "The artwork for Hammer of the Witches was created by Latvian artist Arthur Berzinsh and is a lavish walk-through of the lyricism, drawing on rich renaissance themes and displaying them in beautiful-yet-unsettling scenarios. Half of the detailed pieces are totally original for the release, others are Berzinsh classics cunningly tailored to the themes of the album, which are themes rife with heady witchcraft, be it persecution, retribution or unfettered spiritual liberation. The female form is rampant throughout the artwork, unashamedly displayed in its classical rendition of beauty... and horror."

Release 
The first single and video for the track "Right Wing of the Garden Triptych" was released on 14 May 2015. Hammer of the Witches was released on 10 July.

Reception 

Hammer of the Witches has received a favourable response from critics, who appreciated its change in direction. It has also received a more positive fan response than previous releases in recent years such as The Manticore and Other Horrors and Darkly, Darkly, Venus Aversa, with many praising it as the band's best album since Cruelty and the Beast (1998). The Guardian called it "both a joyous nod towards past glories and a significant creative rebirth" and wrote "these are the most vital and incisive songs Dani Filth has conjured from the dark ether in a long time". AllMusic wrote "on their 11th studio album, this unholy horde, forever wrapped in corpse paint, leather, and spikes, look back more than they do forward. And that proves a good thing [...] Hammer of the Witches doesn't reach the heights of Dusk of Her Embrace , but it does offer proof that there is plenty of fire and creativity left in Cradle of Filth."

Track listing

Personnel
Credits for Hammer of the Witches adapted from liner notes.

Cradle of Filth
 Dani Filth – lead vocals, lyrics
 Richard Shaw – guitar
 Marek 'Ashok' Šmerda – guitar
 Daniel Firth – bass
 Lindsay Schoolcraft – female vocals, harp
 Martin 'Marthus' Škaroupka – drums, keyboards, orchestrations, score, arrangements

Additional musicians
 Alexey Aslamas – violin
 Dalibor Strunc – cimbalom

Production
 Scott Atkins – production, engineering, mixing, mastering
 Toni Davey – design
 Artūrs Bērziņš – cover art, artwork
 Miloš Makovský – conductor
 Rob Kimura – layout
 Sam Scott-Hunter – photography

Charts

References

External links 

 

Cradle of Filth albums
2015 albums